List of rifle cartridges, by primer type, calibre and name.

Rimfire cartridges

Centerfire cartridges

Inches

Smaller than .30 caliber

.30 caliber – .39 caliber

.40 caliber – .49 caliber

.50 caliber and larger

Metric

Smaller than 6mm 
4.5mm mkr
4.6×30mm
4.85×49mm
5mm Craig
5mm/35 SMc
5.45×39mm
5.56×21mm PINDAD
5.56×30mm MINSAS
5.56×45mm NATO
5.6×50mm Magnum
5.6×57mm
5.6×57mmR
5.6×61mm VHSE
5.7×28mm
5.8×21mm
5.8×42mm

6mm–7mm

7mm–8mm

8mm–9mm

9mm and larger

Bore/gauge

.360 bore — 
.410 bore — 
32 Gauge — 
28 Gauge — 
24 Gauge — 
20 Gauge — 
16 Gauge — 
14 Gauge — 
12 Gauge — 
10 bore — 
8 bore — 
6 bore — 
4 bore — 
2 bore —

See also
 List of 5.56×45mm NATO firearms

References

 Originally adapted from Hawks Rifle Cartridges
 Some cartridge info can be found at 6mmbr cartridge diagrams
 Reloading information at Load Data
 Cartridge diagrams at Steve's Pages
 Cartridge and reloading info can be found at Accurate Reloading

 
Rifles
Rifle cartridges

de:Liste Handfeuerwaffenmunition#Büchsenmunition